The Cut is a 2014 internationally co-produced drama film directed by Fatih Akın. It was selected to compete for the Golden Lion at the 71st Venice International Film Festival. The film is about the life and experiences of a young Armenian by the name of Nazareth Manoogian against the backdrop of the Armenian genocide and its repercussions in different parts of the world.

Plot
The film starts by showing how life, as a blacksmith, was in the city of Mardin, where Nazareth and his family used to live. Although Nazareth had his suspicions about possible effects of the World War I, and he was considering the possibility of non-Muslim minorities of the Ottoman Empire being conscripted to fight in the army, his family and friends were trying to be optimistic, although they heard stories of disappearing men from different villages. One night, Ottoman soldiers came to his door and took him to work for the army at a road construction, which is basically in the middle of an uninhabited area. While he was working there and as time passed by, he and his friends started to notice different groups of passer-by Armenians, under arrest. They even witnessed a rape. At one point, an Ottoman officer came to their camp and asked them if they would accept to convert to Islam. Some did and some did not. The officer and his fellows took the converts and left. Some soldiers and convicts, recruited solely to kill Armenians, arrived the next day to kill the rest. The convict responsible for cutting the throat of Nazareth could not go all the way with it and made only a small cut on his throat, which sufficed to cause Nazareth to faint, thereby survive the massacre. However, while saving his life, the cut also made him mute. This "cut" not only symbolizes Nazareth's becoming mute but also his being cut from his life and family and the Armenian society's silence about the Genocide at the time.

His executioner, who is an Ottoman subject, returned and took Nazareth, with whom later on Nazareth joined a gang composed of former defectors. This gang is mainly formed by Ottoman Turks, based on their clear accent, yet they were willing to take Nazareth with them, which is a sign that the ordinary people did not have any problems and the Genocide was substantially based on political will and motive. While trying to survive with the gang, Nazareth came across to an old customer from Mardin, who told Nazareth that surviving Armenians went to Raʾs al-ʿAin, which became one of several cities Nazareth visited to trace his family. When he concluded that everyone in his family had died, he was devastated and unsure about what to do. At that point, he met a soap maker from Aleppo, called Umair Nasreddin. The soap maker provided refuge to not only Nazareth but also many more Armenians, which can also be interpreted as a metaphor: bystanders to the Genocide cleansing their guilt by helping the surviving victims. It is in Aleppo that Nazareth learned that his daughters might still be alive and set out to find them first in Lebanon, then in Cuba and finally in Ruso, North Dakota, United States.

Cast
 Tahar Rahim as Nazaret Manoogian
 Simon Abkarian as Krikor
 Hindi Zahra as Rakel
 Kevork Malikyan as Hagob Nakashian
  as Mehmet
 Zein Fakhoury as Arsinée
 Dina Fakhoury as Lucinée
 Trine Dyrholm as Orphanage Headmistress
 Arsinée Khanjian as Mrs. Nakashian
 Akin Gazi as Hrant
  as Vahan
 Numan Acar as Manuel
 Makram Khoury as Omar Nasreddin
 Anna Savva as Mr. Krikorian

Critical reception
Metacritic gave the film a score of 56 out of 100, based on reviews from 7 critics, indicating "Mixed or average reviews".

References

External links

 

2014 films
2014 drama films
2014 war drama films
2010s historical drama films
German war drama films
German historical drama films
Armenian genocide films
Films set in North Dakota
Films directed by Fatih Akin
2010s German films